The Thad Jones Mel Lewis Quartet is a live album by the Thad Jones Mel Lewis Quartet recorded in 1977 in Miami and released on the Artists House label in 1978.

Reception

Allmusic reviewer by Scott Yanow said "This is one of the finest small-group sessions of cornetist Thad Jones' career ... Jones plays at his peak ... Four of the songs are at least nine minutes long (two are over 15 minutes), yet Jones never loses his momentum. The musicians constantly surprise each other and there are many spontaneous moments during this often brilliant outing".

Track listing
 "But Not for Me" (George Gershwin) − 16:30
 "This Can't Be Love" (Richard Rodgers, Lorenz Hart) − 3:52
 "Autumn Leaves" (Joseph Kosma, Jacques Prévert, Johnny Mercer) − 15:25
 "What Is This Thing" (Mel Lewis, Thad Jones) − 4:45
 "Love for Sale" (Cole Porter) − 9:24 Additional track on CD reissue
 "Things Ain't What They Used to Be" (Mercer Ellington, Ted Persons) − 12:18 Additional track on CD reissue

Personnel
Thad Jones − cornet, flugelhorn
Harold Danko − piano
Rufus Reid − bass
Mel Lewis − drums

References 

Artists House live albums
Thad Jones live albums
Mel Lewis live albums
1978 live albums